Sandmann is the surname of:

 Christoph Sandmann (1967), German equestrian
 Gertrude Sandmann (1893–1981), German artist and Holocaust survivor
 Helmut Sandmann (1944), retired German football player
 Jan Sandmann (1978), German former football player

Occupational surnames
German-language surnames